Frank Hague (January 17, 1876 – January 1, 1956) was an American Democratic Party politician who served as the Mayor of Jersey City from 1917 to 1947, Democratic National Committeeman from New Jersey from 1922 until 1949, and Vice-Chairman of the Democratic National Committee from 1924 until 1949. During his 30 years as mayor, Hague established reforms and innovations that upgraded the city's infrastructure and services, including the construction of parks, schools, and public housing. He also worked to secure funding for public works projects and attracted new businesses to the city, which helped to boost its economy. Simultaneously Mayor Hague had a dark reputation for corruption and bossism and has been called "the grandaddy of Jersey bosses". By the time he left office in 1947, he enjoyed palatial homes, European vacations, and a private suite at the Plaza Hotel. His wealth has been estimated to have been over $10 million at the time of his death, although his City salary never exceeded $8,500 per year and he had no other legitimate source of income. 

During the height of his power Hague's political machine, known as "the organization", was one of the most powerful in the United States controlling politics on local, county, and state levels. Hague's personal influence extended to the national level, influencing federal patronage, and presidential campaigns.

Early life
Francis "Frank" Hague, born in Jersey City, was the fourth of eight children to John D. and Margaret Hague (née Fagen), immigrants from County Cavan, Ireland. He was raised in Jersey City's Second ward, an area known as The Horseshoe due to its shape which wrapped around a railroad loop. The ward was created when the Republican-controlled legislature gerrymandered a district within Jersey City in 1871 to concentrate and isolate Democratic, and mostly Catholic, votes.

By age 14, Hague was expelled from school before completing the sixth grade for poor attendance and unacceptable behavior. He worked briefly as a blacksmith's apprentice for the Erie Railroad. While training at a local gym for his own potential debut as a prizefighter, he arranged to become manager for Joe Craig, a professional lightweight boxer. Craig was successful enough to allow Hague to buy a few suits that made him appear successful. In 1896, Hague's apparent prosperity gained him the attention of local tavern owner "Nat" Kenny who was seeking a candidate for constable in the upcoming primary to run against the candidate of a rival tavern owner. Kenny provided Hague with $75 to "spread around", and Frank Hague quickly won his first election by a ratio of three-to-one.

Political career

Early success
Hague's victory in the Constable election brought him to the attention of Hudson County Democratic political boss "Little Bob" Davis, and Davis asked Hague to help get out Democratic votes for the upcoming 1897 Mayoral election. Hague's efforts were credited with generating large voter turnout in the Second Ward for the 1897 and 1899 elections. As a reward for his work, Hague was appointed as a deputy sheriff at a salary of $25 per week. Over this time, Hague took a leadership role in the Second Ward Democratic club.

In the 1901 Mayoral election, Republican Mark M. Fagan was elected. Hague's second ward was one of only two that voted Democratic. Hague survived a Republican challenge for a third term as Constable the following year.

The "Red Dugan" affair
As a ward leader, Hague was approached by a woman to provide assistance for her son, who had been arrested for passing a forged check. The son, Red Dugan, had been a classmate of Hague's in school. According to the Boston Evening Transcript of October 4, 1904, Dugan had deposited a forged check for $955 in the Peoples Bank of Roxbury, Massachusetts, and convinced the bank manager to let him withdraw $500. Hague ignored a subpoena to testify in Hudson County Court and traveled to Massachusetts to provide an alibi for Dugan. Hague and another deputy sheriff, Thomas "Skidder" Madigan, claimed that they had seen Dugan in Jersey City on the day of the alleged offense. Both were threatened with perjury charges.

Upon returning to Jersey City, Hague was found guilty of contempt of court for ignoring the subpoena. He was fined $100 and stripped of his duties as Deputy Sheriff.

In spite of the resulting press coverage of the event, Hague was more deeply embraced by his constituency. Thomas Smith wrote: "But to the residents of the Horseshoe, Frank Hague had gone out of his way to help a friend – had practically given his livelihood to aid a brother." In the succeeding municipal election of 1905, which saw the return of incumbent Fagan to the office of mayor, Hague was elected to a fourth term as constable.

Ward leader
Hague rose through the Democratic machinery of Hudson County, which drew much of its strength by providing newly arrived immigrants with rudimentary social services. Hague took a job as a collector for a local brewery, leaving him with time to spend in the streets and the local taverns which were hubs of political activity. He also spent his time cleaning up the loose ends of the Second Ward's south-end Democratic Club to consolidate his power.

As a reward for his efforts in turning out votes in the 1905 election, Bob Davis named Hague as the party leader for the Second Ward and arranged for Hague to be appointed as Sergeant at Arms for the New Jersey State Assembly.

Political reformer
Hague broke ties with "Boss" Davis in 1906 over a difference of opinion on a candidate for appointment to the city Street and Water Board. As a result, Hague supported H. Otto Wittpenn for mayor in the 1907 election. Wittpenn was a reformer who opposed the control Davis held over Hudson County politics. Over the objections of Davis, newly elected Mayor Wittpenn appointed Hague as chief custodian of City Hall – a "cushy" job with plenty of patronage opportunities. During the Wittpenn administration, Hague also became friendly with Wittpenn's secretary – a Presbyterian Sunday school teacher named A. Harry Moore.

The resulting battle for control of the Hudson County Democratic machine would ironically result in one of the greatest boosts to Hague's rise to power – the Walsh Act of 1911. In 1909 Davis, seeing support for Hague increasing, supported Wittpenn's re-election against former mayor Fagan. Hague's second ward produced the largest plurality of Wittpenn votes of any of Jersey City's 12 wards. Davis then arranged the appointment of Fagan to the Hudson County Tax Board. When Wittpenn's administration began facing troubles, including Fagan's discovery of a Pennsylvania Railroad property that had paid no taxes for four years, Wittpenn blamed Davis.

Seeking to curb the influence of Davis, Wittpenn announced his candidacy for Governor, stating "I have endured the machine as long as possible, but patience is no longer a virtue." Davis, in turn, prevailed upon Woodrow Wilson, then President of Princeton University, to oppose Wittpenn's candidacy. Wilson's victory was overwhelming even in Hague's ward, despite heavy-handed tactics used there. The Jersey Journal wrote: "Cops on duty were using clubs and blackjacks to assist Mayor Wittpenn and Frank Hague defeat the Davis men."

Wilson's reform-minded term as Governor saw the establishment of Presidential primary elections, introduced workers' compensation, and brought about passage of the Walsh Act which provided for a non-partisan commission form of municipal government that was greatly reflective of his academic writings in Congressional Government.

"Little Bob" Davis died of cancer shortly after the 1910 gubernatorial election leaving a vacuum in the power structure of the Hudson County Democrats. Wittpenn quickly endorsed the idea of converting Jersey City to a commission form of government, but was opposed by forces, including Hague, attempting to take control of the party. Hague campaigned heavily against the idea in the Horseshoe, claiming that such a system of citywide elected commissioners would erode the influence of the working-class and consolidate power among the city's elite. Wittpenn's opponents successfully petitioned for a change in the date of the vote on the charter change, moving it from September to mid-July, and the proposal was defeated. As a result of this campaign, Hague came under the scrutiny of The Jersey Journal, which had supported the proposed charter change. It was reported that Hague's older brother, a battalion chief on the city fire department, had been on "sick leave" for three years at full pay.

Hague reconciled with Wittpenn to support his re-election in 1911. Wittpenn then supported Hague's nomination for Commissioner of Streets and Water. Both were elected. The new position greatly expanded Hague's patronage authority. While City Hall employed a few dozen custodians, there were hundreds of workers in the Street and Water Department. Hague's work as head of the Department of Street Cleaners even convinced The Jersey Journal to endorse him as a "reform candidate" in the next election.

In the spring of 1913, having gained confidence in his own ability to assure himself a place on the commission, Hague supported the renewed effort to change the Jersey City government from the Mayor-Council model to a commission model under the recently adopted Walsh Act. This act would place all executive and legislative powers in a five-man commission, each of whom would head a city department. The five commissioners would choose one of their colleagues to be mayor. The vote for charter change passed, and the stage was set for Frank Hague's rise to power.

Commissioner
In 1913, the first election for the city commission saw 91 men on the ballot competing for five available seats on the commission. Hague finished fourth with 17,390 votes and was elected to the five-man commission. The only Wittpenn-supported candidate, A. Harry Moore, was also elected. As a result of having garnered the most votes (21,419) former mayor Fagan became the first mayor under this new form of government, and the only Republican to hold that title in Jersey City for the following 75 years. Hague was named public safety commissioner, with control over the police and fire departments. In the same year, Hague cemented his control of the Hudson County political machine by securing for himself the leadership of the Hudson County Democratic Organization Executive Committee.

Hague immediately set about reshaping the corrupt Jersey City police force with tough Horseshoe recruits. Hague spearheaded crackdowns on prostitution and narcotics trafficking, earning him favor with religious leaders. These enforcement acts went as far as Hague himself marching across local Vaudeville stages personally directing the shut down of "girlie shows." At the heart of this change was an inner cadre of officers known as the Zeppelin Squad or "zepps" who were personally loyal to Hague alone. The "zepps" would spy on, and report back to Hague about other members of the department. Eventually, Jersey City had one patrolman for every 3,000 residents, causing a marked decline in the city's once-astronomical crime rate.

Hague took steps to curb the police department's lackadaisical work ethic, punishing offenses that had gone unpunished for years. He also made much-needed improvements to the fire department; at the time he took office Jersey City's fire insurance rates were among the highest in the nation.

Upon discovering in early 1916 that millions of pounds of munitions were being stockpiled on the Jersey City waterfront, Hague travelled to Washington, D.C. to register concerns for the safety of his constituents. His meetings with Congressmen resulted in no action, Congress having decided that Jersey City was an "appropriate port." Hague's concerns were shown to be valid in July 1916 when the Black Tom explosion sent shrapnel flying across the city.

In 1917, Hague, with his reputation as the man who cleaned up the police force, ran for reelection.  He put together a commission ticket called "The Unbossed."  The ticket consisted of him, Parks Commissioner Moore, Revenue Commissioner George Brensinger, ex-judge Charles F.X. O'Brien and City Clerk Michael I. Fagan.  It swept all five spots on the commission.  Moore topped the poll, and traditional practice called for him to be appointed mayor.  However, when the commission met for the first time on May 11, Hague was chosen as the new mayor.

Boss of Jersey City
Technically, Hague's only responsibility as mayor was to appoint the school board. Otherwise, he was merely first among equals, with no powers over and above the other four commissioners. However, soon after taking office, he wrested control of the Hudson County Democratic Party from Wittpenn. This allowed him to significantly influence the makeup of the commission in this overwhelmingly Democratic city. He soon built the organization into one of the most powerful political machines in the country. Hague himself became very wealthy, owning a $125,000 summer home in Deal, living in a large apartment in the best building in the city, and able to give a $50,000 altar to a local Catholic church. In 1941, Dartmouth professor Dayton David McKean wrote The Boss, a book about Hague's political machine, in which he estimated his amassed wealth at four million dollars on an annual mayoral salary of $8,000 a year.

He also had the support of a significant faction of Republicans which dated to his initial election as mayor, when he cut a deal with then-Governor Walter Edge in which Edge effectively ceded North Jersey to Hague in return for keeping South Jersey for himself. Also, as public safety commissioner (a post he held throughout his entire tenure), he controlled the two departments with the most patronage appointments in the city. This post also placed responsibility for maintaining public order in his hands.

Hague soon extended his influence statewide by helping to elect his "puppets" as governor. In the 1919 gubernatorial election, Hague endorsed State Senator Edward I. Edwards and aggressively campaigned for him. Edwards carried Hudson County by 50,000 votes, which was enough for him to win statewide by just under 15,000 votes. Hague proclaimed himself leader of the New Jersey Democratic Party, and Edwards allowed him to recommend dozens of appointments to high state offices. Democrats won five out of eight gubernatorial races between 1919 and 1940, more often than not due to massive landslides in Hudson County. However, he was never able to extend his dominance to the state legislature.

Hague was able to stay in power despite a nearly constant effort to turn him out of office from 1921 onward. He was also able to avoid prosecution despite numerous federal and state investigations in part because he took most of his kickbacks in cash. However, from the early 1940s onward, many of the city's longer-tenured ethnic groups started moving to the suburbs. They were replaced by Poles, Italians, Eastern Europeans and African-Americans. Hague never adapted his methods to the new groups.

Hague had little tolerance for those who dared oppose him publicly. He relied on two ordinances of dubious constitutionality to muzzle critics. A 1920 ordinance effectively required people making political speeches to obtain clearance from the chief of police. A 1930 ordinance gave the public safety commissioner—Hague himself—the power to turn down permits for meetings if he felt it necessary to prevent "riots, disturbances or disorderly assemblage." The latter ordinance was struck down as unconstitutional by the Supreme Court of the United States, but continued to be enforced for several years after that decision. The police were also allowed to stop and search anyone without probable cause or a warrant after 9 pm.

In 1932, Hague, a friend of Al Smith, backed Smith against Franklin D. Roosevelt during the race for the Democratic nomination. When Roosevelt won the nomination, Hague offered to organize the biggest political rally anyone had ever seen if Roosevelt would launch his presidential campaign in New Jersey. When Roosevelt formally began his campaign with an event at the Jersey Shore town of Sea Girt, Hague's machine made sure there were several thousand Hudson County voters looking on and cheering. Hague's support was rewarded with funding for a massive medical center complex complete with a maternity hospital named after his mother, Margaret Hague. During the 1936 campaign Hague provided 150,000 adults and children to cheer Roosevelt during a visit.

Hague's use of voter fraud is the stuff of legend. In 1937, for instance, Jersey City had 160,050 registered voters, but only 147,000 people who were at least 21 years old—the legal voting age.

In 1932, Governor Moore appointed a lawyer named Thomas J. Brogan, who had served as Hague's personal attorney in corruption hearings, to an associate Justice seat on the state's Supreme Court. Less than a year later Brogan was named as Chief Justice. In at least two instances of alleged voting fraud in the 1930s (Ferguson v. Brogan, 112 N.J.L. 471; Clee v. Moore, 119 N.J.L. 215; In re Clee, 119 N.J.L. 310), Brogan's court issued extraordinary rulings in favor of the Democratic machine, in one case asserting that the district superintendent of elections had no authority to open ballot boxes, and in another case ruling that the boxes could be opened, but no one had the right to look inside. Brogan also assigned himself to the Hudson County jurisdiction, thereby controlling the local grand jury process and squelching other election fraud cases.

Retirement from politics
The beginning of the end for Hague came in 1943, when former governor Walter Edge was returned to office. Edge's attorney general, Walter Van Riper, initiated several prosecutions of Hague cronies. Hague retaliated by having his handpicked U.S. Attorney for the District of New Jersey bring federal indictments against Van Riper, but Van Riper was acquitted. Edge also initiated reforms in the civil service, freeing it from Hague's control.

Edge's successor, fellow Republican Alfred Driscoll, succeeded in further curbing Hague's power over state government. He led the effort to implement a new constitution, which streamlined state government and made it less vulnerable to control by locally based bosses like Hague. For example, county prosecutors were now directly accountable to the state attorney general. It also set up a new state Supreme Court, which was given supervision over the state's judges. As the first Chief Justice, Driscoll appointed an old Hague foe, Arthur T. Vanderbilt. Driscoll also installed voting machines throughout the state, which made it harder for corrupt politicians to steal elections.

Seeing the writing on the wall, Hague abruptly announced his retirement in 1947. However, he was able to have his nephew, Frank Hague Eggers, chosen as his successor. It was generally understood that Hague still held the real power. This ended in 1949 when John V. Kenny, a former Hague ward leader alienated by the appointment of Eggers, put together his own commission ticket. Due to the presence of a "third ticket," Kenny's ticket was able to oust the Hague/Eggers ticket from power, ending Hague's 32-year rule. Kenny soon set up a machine which proved every bit as corrupt as Hague's, but far less efficient at providing services.

Death
Hague died on New Year's Day in 1956 at his 480 Park Avenue duplex apartment in Manhattan, New York City. While hundreds gathered to see the casket depart the funeral home, only four men were seen to remove their hats for the passing of the coffin. One woman present held an American Flag and a sign that read, "God have mercy on his sinful, greedy soul."

Hague was interred in a large mausoleum at Holy Name Cemetery in Jersey City.

Legacy
Hague's pride and joy was the Jersey City Medical Center, which he began creating almost as soon as he became mayor. By the 1940s it had grown into a 10-building complex that provided virtually free medical care to Jersey City residents. At the time of its completion, the Medical Center was one of the biggest medical facilities in the country and included the Medical Center Hospital, Pollak Chest Diseases Hospital, Murdoch Hall, and Margaret Hague Maternity Hospital, named in honor of Hague's mother. The buildings, funded in part through federal funds obtained by Hague, are known for their Art Deco details, including marble walls, terrazzo floors, etched glass, and decorative moldings. Even at the time the Medical Center was too large to operate cost-effectively. In 2005 the 14 acre complex (much of which had fallen into disuse) was sold to a private developer who began converting two towers into a luxury condominium complex called the Beacon.

A 1993 survey of historians, political scientists and urban experts conducted by Melvin G. Holli of the University of Illinois at Chicago ranked Hague as the second-worst American big-city mayor to have served between the years 1820 and 1993.

Quotes
"We hear about constitutional rights, free speech and the free press. Every time I hear those words I say to myself, 'That man is a Red, that man is a Communist.' You never heard a real American talk in that manner." – speech to the Jersey City Chamber of Commerce, January 12, 1938.

"Listen, here is the law! I am the law! These boys go to work!" – speech on city government to the Emory Methodist Episcopal Church in Jersey City, November 10, 1937.

See also
 List of mayors of Jersey City, New Jersey

Notes

References
 
 
 
 
  (originally published—Boston: Houghton Mifflin, 1940).

External links

  Full text of the decision from FindLaw.com
 
 Frank Hague Page at Jersey City History
 The Life and Times of Frank Hague (2001) A five-part radio program
 The Pragmatic Populism of a Non-Partisan Politician: An Analysis of the Political Philosophy of Charles Edison

1876 births
1956 deaths
American people of Irish descent
People from Deal, New Jersey
Mayors of Jersey City, New Jersey
Political corruption in the United States
Culture of Jersey City, New Jersey
American political bosses
American political bosses from New Jersey
New Jersey Democrats
Burials at Holy Name Cemetery (Jersey City, New Jersey)
Catholics from New Jersey
American anti-communists
Nucky Johnson's Organization